Kabel Eins is a German free-to-air television channel that was launched on 29 February 1992 as Der Kabelkanal. It is owned by ProSiebenSat.1 Media AG. It is largely known for airing classic American films as well as TV series and documentaries. It is considered to be a sister channel of ProSieben.

Kabel Eins has regularly taken over TV series from ProSieben when they were not successful enough or had already been broadcast several times. An example is Without a Trace, which was considered a failure on ProSieben but is quite successful on Kabel Eins. It also acquired several shows from RTL II. On May 4, 2016, ProSiebenSat.1 announced that the station kabel eins Doku would be launched as a spin-off of kabel eins in the second half of 2016. Thorsten Pütsch took over management of the station. The station focuses entirely on documentaries and reports and can be seen on free-to-air television.

Programming

Imported series and shows

24 (2009-2016)
ALF (2002-2011)
Angel (2007-2011)
Booker (1995-1996)
Buffy the Vampire Slayer (Buffy – Im Bann der Dämonen) (2006-2008)
Cagney & Lacey (2000-2002)
Castle
Charmed (Charmed – )
Cold Case (Cold Case – )
Criminal Minds: Suspect Behavior (Criminal Minds: Team Red) (2012)
Damages (Damages – )
Dark Blue (2010, 2017)
Diagnosis: Murder (Diagnose: Mord) (1996-2005, 2010)
Eureka (EUReKA - Die geheime Stadt) (2013–2014, 2018–present)
Everybody Loves Raymond
Forever
Frasier (1995-200?)
General Hospital (1992-1994)
Ghost Whisperer (Ghost Whisperer – )
Hey Dad...!
Highway to Heaven (Ein Engel auf Erden) (1994-1995, 2001-2005, 2012–2014)
Homeland (2015)
Homicide Hunter (Homicide Hunter - Dem Mörder auf der Spur) (2015)
Hotel (2004)
Justice
Kojak (2006)
Kung Fu: The Legend Continues (Kung Fu - Im Zeichen des Drachen) (1996-1997, 2004)
Little House on the Prairie
Lost
MacGyver
Married... with Children
Matlock (1995, 2001-2004)
Medical Investigation
Medium (Medium – )
Miami Vice (2006-2007)
Murder, She Wrote (Mord ist ihr Hobby) (2009-2010, 2016-2017)
My Wife and Kids (What's up, Dad?)
NCIS (Navy CIS)
NUMB3RS (Numb3rs - Die Logik des Verbrechens) (2009-2017)
One Life to Live (Liebe, Lüge, Leidenschaft) (1992)
Primeval (Primeval – Rückkehr der Urzeitmonster)
Quincy, M.E (Quincy)
Roseanne (1992-1993, 2002, 2004, 2006-2009)
Rules of Engagement
Scorpion (2017–present)
Seinfeld (1995-1996, 2005-2006)
Stalker (2018)
T. J. Hooker (1994-2001)
That '70s Show (Die wilden Siebziger)
The Cosby Show (Bill Cosby Show)
The Forgotten (2010)
The Good Wife (Good Wife)
The King of Queens
The Pacific (2010, 2013, 2018)
The Shield (The Shield - Gesetz der Gewalt) (2007, 2012-2017)
Three's Company (Herzbube mit 2 Damen) (1992, 1996-1997)
Top Gear
Two and a Half Men (2009-2012)
V (V - Die außerirdischen Besucher kommen) (1995-1998)
Wisdom of the Crowd (2018)
Without a Trace (Without a Trace – Spurlos verschwunden) (2004–present)
Zorro (Zorro - Der schwarze Rächer) (1996-1998)

Imported animation

Sonic X (2004-2011)
Star Wars: The Clone Wars (2010-2012)

Local
Abenteuer Alltag (Adventures Everyday)
Abenteuer Alltag - Jetzt bauen wir (Adventures Everyday - Now We Are Building)
Abenteuer Auto (Car Adventures)
Abenteuer Leben - Täglich Wissen (Adventures of Life - Daily Knowledge)
Darf man das (Quiz)
Der Comedyflüsterer (The Comedy Whisperer)
kabel eins news
Männer allein daheim (Men Alone at Home)
Mein neuer Job (My New Job)
Mein neues Leben (My New Life)
Mein neues Leben XXL (My New Life XXL)
Mein schlimmster Tag
Spätnachrichten (News)
Wir sind viele

Former programming blocks
 Cartoon Network (Saturday mornings)
 Disney Time (Sunday mornings)
 Jetix (Sunday mornings)

Audience share

Germany

The average age of the viewers is 48.4 years (as of 2016).

References

External links
Official Site

Television stations in Germany
Television stations in Austria
Television stations in Switzerland
German-language television stations
Television channels and stations established in 1992
1992 establishments in Germany
ProSiebenSat.1 Media
Companies based in Bavaria
Mass media in Munich